This article documents the timeline of transmission of COVID-19 during the COVID-19 pandemic in New Zealand throughout 2022.

Transmission timeline
Data about the previous day is extracted from the Institute of Environmental Science and Research's database at 9:00 am daily and is publicly released by the Ministry of Health around 1:00 pm.

January

On 2 January, two new deaths were reported at Auckland City Hospital within the past 48 hours.

On 8 January, two new locations of interests were identified in Rotorua including a Burger Fuel restaurant and BP Connection petrol station.

On 10 January, two new locations of interests were identified in Queenstown including a SkyCity casino.

On 12 January, the Ministry of Health reported two new deaths. These fatalities included a man in his 30s who died at home on 5 January and a man in his 60s who died at Middlemore Hospital on 9 January.

On 19 January, health authorities confirmed that two COVID-19 positive individuals in Auckland (an Auckland Airport worker and a household contact of an MIQ worker) had the Omicron variant.

By 20 January, the Hawke's Bay region had reported a total of six cases in the region, five of them linked to a positive case who visited a fitness class.

On 21 January, nine cases were reported in Motueka in the Nelson–Marlborough Region.

By 22 January, the number of cases in Hastings had risen to 13.

On 27 January, 34 new Omicron cases were reported, bringing the total number of Omicron community cases to 90. That same day, the Soundsplash music festival which took place in Hamilton between 21 and 23 January was identified as a location of interest. Five attendees had tested positive for COVID-19, with one testing positive for the Omicron variant. By 28 January, 68 people were considered close contacts of the infected, with health experts warning that the Soundsplash festival could become a superspreader event.

On 28 January, 15 new Omicron cases were reported, bringing the total number of Omicron community cases to 105.

On 30 January, the Health Ministry confirmed that a patient in their 70s at North Shore Hospital had died from COVID-19, bringing the death toll to 53. Due to technical issues, the Health Ministry had not included 40 new cases in Auckland for the daily report.

February

On 4 February, New Zealand reported a record 209 new community: 21 in Northland, 99 in the Auckland Region, 51 in Waikato, 15 in Rotorua, 15 in Bay of Plenty, three in Hawke's Bay, four in Tairāwhiti and one in MidCentral. In addition, 64 cases were reported in managed isolation.

On 7 February, several schools reported positive cases among students and staff including Te Mata Primary School (four students) in Hastings' Havelock North suburb, Hamilton Boys' High School (one student), Hamilton Christian School (one student), Rototuna Junior and Senior High School (one student), Melville Intermediate School (one student) and Prospect School (one staff member) in Auckland's Glen Eden suburb.

On 10 February, Queenstown in the South Island's Otago region reported two community cases. These mark the first new community cases in the Southern District Health Board since 17 April 2020. That same day, two students at Ilminister Intermediate School in Gisborne in the North Island tested positive for COVID-19. As a result, half the school and seven teachers were into self-isolation. Later that day, a community case was reported in Dunedin. The individual had spent time in Wanaka and Cromwell during their infectious period.

On 11 February, two community cases were reported in Invercargill and Gore, New Zealand in the South Island's Southland Region. Both cases had previously visited the Queenstown area.

On 12 February, six staff and seven patients at Auckland City Hospital tested positive for COVID-19. In response, all patients and two staff at two wards for the elderly were ordered to undergo testing.

On 13 February, a positive case was reported at Musselburgh School in Dunedin. In response, all Year 5 and Year 6 students at the school were identified as close contacts with families being asked to get their children tested.

On 14 February, 19 cases were reported in Otago and Southland, bringing the total number of cases in the Southern District Health Board to 51.

On 15 February, a student at Gore Main School tested positive for COVID-19; prompting 25 other students, three teachers, and two teacher aides to go into self-isolation. In addition, Gore Preschool was closed as a precaution after a visitor tested positive for COVID-19.

On 17 February, Public Health South and the University of Otago confirmed that two parties held on Castle Street and Hyde Street between 12 and 15 February during Orientation Week were close contact sites. Students who attended the parties were advised by health authorities to get tested. Though the University advised all students attending the party to get tested, confusion emerged when local health providers including WellSouth opted to only test individuals who were symptomatic or close contacts.

By 18 February, several Dunedin schools including Carisbrook School, Bradford School, Balmacewen Intermediate School, Otago Boys' High School, Columba College, and Queenstown's Wakatipu High School had reported positive cases.

On 21 February, two new deaths were reported in Auckland. One was a patient at Middlemore Hospital while the other was a patient in their 70s at Auckland City Hospital.

On 22 February, a Dunedin pathology worker at Southern Community Laboratory tested positive for COVID-19. That same day, King's and Queen's High Schools in Dunedin also reported positive cases.

From 24 February, RATs are now included in the daily tally separate from PCR tests. In addition, health authorities confirmed the death of another patient at Middlemore Hospital in Auckland. That same day, the Convoy 2022 New Zealand's Wellington protest camp was identified by the Health Ministry as a "location of interest." People present the occupation between 11.55am and 11pm on 19 February and 11am and 11.59pm on 20 February were considered close contacts.

On 25 February, five new deaths were reported in hospital, bringing the death toll to 62. Two were from Auckland's North Shore Hospital, two from Waikato and one from Tauranga.

On 28 February, David Parker tested positive for COVID-19, become the first New Zealand Member of Parliament to test positive for the disease.

March

On 6 March, the Chatham Islands recorded its first two cases of COVID-19. In response, the Canterbury District Health Board distributed rapid antigen kits to all households residing on the islands.

On 7 March, four Members of Parliament including National Party MP Simon Bridges, Police Minister Poto Williams, Attorney General David Parker, and Labour Party MP Anahila Kanongata'a-Suisuiki tested positive for COVID-19. In addition, Māori Party co-leader Rawiri Waititi entered into isolation after his family tested positive.

By 8 March, National Party leader Christopher Luxon along with fellow National MPs Mark Mitchell and Stuart Smith had tested positive for COVID-19. In addition a third of National MPs and six Labour MPs had entered into self-isolation after being identified as close contacts.

On 10 March, the death statistic definition was changed to include all cases who died within 28 days of being reported as a COVID-19 case even if their cause of death was ultimately unrelated. Because of this the Ministry also began reporting separate tallies of deaths classified as being clearly caused by COVID-19 and clearly not caused by it.

On 16 March, the COVID-19 Response Minister Chris Hipkins tested positive for COVID-19.

By 30 March, the Southern District Health Board had reported 8,336 active cases in the Otago and Southland regions.

April

On 2 April, Radio New Zealand reported that men accounted for two thirds of COVID-19 deaths in New Zealand, citing figures released by the Ministry of Health. The Health Ministry confirmed that 190 of the COVID-19 fatalities reported in 2022 were men, compared with 114 women. Epidemiologist Michael Baker stated that these trends followed overseas patterns but also identified underlying health conditions and age as bigger factors than biological sex in influencing COVID-19 death rates. In addition, Health Ministry figures confirmed that slightly more women than men were infected by COVID-19, with women accounting for 56% of those hospitalised with the virus.

May

On 1 May, the Ministry of Health confirmed its first case of the BA.4 variant of the SARS-CoV-2 Omicron variant. The individual had arrived from South Africa on 22 April and tested positive on 24 April. The second case of the BA.4 variant was reported on 2 May.

On 8 May, New Zealand reported its first case of the BA.5 variant of the Omicron variant at the border. The individual had arrived from South Africa on 26 April and tested positive on 1 May. The following day, two more cases of the BA.5 variant were reported at the border. Both cases originated in South Africa.

On 10 May, the total number of cases in New Zealand exceeded the 1 million mark, rising to 1,005,674.

On 14 May, Prime Minister Jacinda Ardern tested positive for COVID-19. Her partner Clarke Gayford had earlier tested positive for COVID-19 on 8 May.

On 17 May, the total number of recoveries in NZ exceeded the 1 million mark, reaching 1,004,731.

On 18 May, the Health Ministry's announced death toll exceed the 1,000 mark, reaching 1,017. This figure includes COVID-deaths that occurred more than 28 days after a COVID-19 case was reported and deaths with incomplete details.

On 22 May 2022, Mayor of Wellington Andy Foster tested positive for COVID-19.

June

On 3 June, the first four community cases of the Omicron subvariant BA.5 and the first case of the BA.4 subvariant were reported in New Zealand.

On 30 June, Deputy Prime Minister Grant Robertson tested positive for COVID-19.

July

On 4 July, University of Canterbury mathematics professor and Covid-19 modeller Michael Plank described the rapid spread of BA.5 variant cases throughout the country as a second wave of COVID-19 infections. He estimated that the BA.5 variant would overtake the BA.2 variant as the dominant variant within New Zealand in a matter of weeks.

On 6 July, no update was released due to technical difficulties on the Ministry of Health's website. As a result, the daily update was delayed till the following day.

On 7 July, the Ministry of Health updated the daily reports to include reinfections.

On 19 July, Public Health Agency Deputy Director-General Dr. Andrew Old announced that the Health Ministry would be changing the reporting of deaths from people who had died of a COVID-19 infection within 28 days to people who had either died as a result of a COVID-19 infection or where COVID-19 was a contributing factor to their death.

On 25 July, the national death toll exceed 2,000, reaching 2,006. 836 COVID-19 cases were in hospital, with Christchurch Hospital reporting 169 cases; its highest number since the COVID-19 pandemic began. The following day, the Ministry of Health revised the definition of COVID-19 deaths from deaths within 28 days of testing positive for COVID-19 to deaths attributed to COVID-19.

August

On 10 August, Radio New Zealand reported that 87 people had died of COVID-19 in their homes since March 2022. According to figures released by the public health service Te Whatu Ora (Health New Zealand), an average of four people have been dying from COVID-19 in their homes since the outbreak of the Omicron virus in New Zealand. 92% of the deceased were aged over 60 years. In terms of ethnic composition, Europeans accounted for over 50% of deaths, Māori accounted for 18% of deaths, and Pacific Islanders accounted for 19% of deaths. In terms of vaccination status, 22% of the decease were unvaccinated, 25% were fully vaccinated, and 49% had received vaccine boosters.

On 13 August, the Ministry of Health confirmed there were 546 COVID-19 patients in hospital including ten in intensive care. The Health Ministry also confirmed that a total of 1,750 deaths could be attributed to COVID-19, with an average of 14 deaths occurring over the past week.

September

On 13 September, the Ministry of Health announced that it would be shifting its release of COVID-19 updates from daily reports to weekly reports. Future COVID reports will be published on Monday, with the next due to be released on 19 September.

October

On 13 October, the Ministry of Health reported that the new Omicron subvariant BQ.1.1 was discovered in a COVID-19 positive person and South Island wastewater samples.

On 17 October, the Ministry of Health acknowledged that it had under-reported the number of people hospitalised with COVID-19 throughout the entire pandemic in New Zealand by 5,000. As a result, the official figure was revised from 14,043 to 19,476.

By 27 October, the Ministry of Health reported that cases were averaging over 1,500 per day. 3,575 cases were reported that day while 3,923 cases were reported on 26 October. The Ministry described this surge in cases as part of a "third wave" of COVID-19 cases that year.

November

By 7 November, Radio New Zealand reported that the weekly rolling average of COVID-19 cases had risen by more than 60% since September 2022, leading to a third wave of COVID infections. 15% of the 20,802 cases reported over the past week were re-infections. In addition, the hospitalisation and death rates increased during that period; with 322 in hospital, 8 in intensive care, and 13 deaths. In addition, the population's immunity to COVID-19 was affected by long gaps between boosters and past infections and new overseas COVID strains such as XBB and BQ.1. In response, several public health experts including epidemiologist Michael Baker, immunologist Anna Brooks, and vaccinologist Helen Petousis-Harris called for the reinstatement of mask mandates and government support for vaccine rollouts including the Bivalent vaccine.

December

On 19 December, the Government confirmed that New Zealand's COVID-19 settings would remain unchanged over the summer with positive cases expected to isolate for seven days. The seven day rolling average for new daily cases is 6,099, making it the worst week in the latest Omicron outbreak. Based on these figures, University of Auckland computational evolution senior lecturer  Dr David Welch estimated that two or three out of every 100 individuals was being infected. College for Emergency Medicine chair Kate Allan expressed concerns that the movement of tourists to the Coromandel, Thames, Northland Region, Queenstown and Wanaka could place hospitals under strain. University of Otago epidemiologist Dr Michael Baker advised people to wear respirator masks in shopping malls and supermarkets.

Traffic lights timeline

Notes

References

2022
2022 in New Zealand